Municipio IV (or Municipality 4) is one of the 15 administrative subdivisions of the city of Rome in Italy. It is located in the northeastern part of the capital.

The Rebibbia urban zone and Rebibbia prison lie within this municipality.

References

External links 

Municipi of Rome